The Trans himalaya (also spelled Trans-Himalaya), or "Gangdise – Nyenchen Tanglha range", is a  mountain range in China, India and Nepal, extending in a west–east direction parallel to the main Himalayan range. Located north of Yarlung Tsangpo river on the southern edge of the Tibetan Plateau, the Transhimalaya is composed of the Gangdise range to the west and the Nyenchen Tanglha range to the east.

The name Transhimalaya was introduced by the Swedish geographer Sven Hedin in early 20th century. The Transhimalaya was described by the Columbia Lippincott Gazetteer in 1952 as an "ill-defined mountain area" with "no marked crest line or central alignment and no division by rivers." On more-modern maps the Kailas Range (Gangdise or Kang-to-sé Shan) in the west is shown as distinct from the Nyenchen Tanglha range in the east.

Geology
The Transhimalayas are geologically distinct from the other Himalayan ranges. They were probably formed by subduction of sediments from the collision of the Indian and Eurasian plates. A consensus of different dating methods suggests that the older parts of this range formed in the upper Cretaceous (82-113 Mya), while the younger regions formed in the Eocene (40-60 Mya).

Climate
The Transhimalays generally have a cold, arid montane climate. For example, the Spiti region of Himachal Pradesh, India, has an annual rainfall of about 170 mm. However, studies in Mustang District, Nepal, indicate that climate change is warming the Transhimalayas at a rate of about 0.13 degrees a year.

Biodiversity
The Transhimalayas generally have low species diversity (and vegetation cover) and are classified as dry alpine steppes. However, a study in the Spiti region found 23 medicinal plants. Previous surveys in this region had found a total of over 800 species of vascular plants.

The Transhimalayas are home to the once endangered snow leopard, the Eurasian lynx, Tibetan wolf, red fox and Tibetan fox. Native herbivores include the argali, Tibetan gazelle, urial, wild ass or kiang, Asiatic ibex, yak and bharal.

Conflict and Conservation
The Tibetan wolf, snow leopard and lynx are major predators of livestock in the Ladakh region of India. Goats, sheep, yak and horses were their most common prey. In Mustang, Nepal, rising temperatures and declining snowfall are reducing the area available for agriculture, forcing villagers to relocate and reducing grassland and forest cover. This has also led to bharal shifting to lower elevations, where they raid crops. In turn, this attracts snow leopards to human settlements, where they prey on livestock.

On the other hand, many wild herbivores are out-competed and displaced by livestock. A historical analysis suggests that the Transhimalayas have lost four wild herbivores over the last millennium or so of human habitation. Many parts of the Transhimalayas are now conserved. These include the Kangrinboqê National Forest Park in China, the Pin Valley National Park (675 sq. km.) and Kibber Wildlife Sanctuary (1400 sq. km.) in India and parts of the Annapurna Conservation Area (7,629 sq. km.) in Nepal. In addition to protecting species diversity, restoration of the native Transhimalayan grasslands has also been found to trap more carbon in the soil, mitigating climate change.

Gallery

See also

 Geology of the Himalaya
 Indus Suture Zone 

 Transhimalaya, includes the following two
 Lhasa terrane 
 Karakoram fault system

 Bangong-Nujiang Suture Zone
 Qiangtang terrane

References

Citations

Sources 

 

 
Mountain ranges of the Himalayas
Mountain ranges of Myanmar
Mountain ranges of Tibet
Mountain ranges of Sichuan